Big Bass Lake is a private community and census-designated place (CDP) in Clifton and Covington Townships in Lackawanna County and Lehigh Township, Wayne County,  Pennsylvania, United States. The community's population was 1,270 at time of the 2010 United States Census.

Geography
Big Bass Lake is located at  (41.2533624, -75.4840284).

According to the United States Census Bureau, the CDP has a total area of 4.37 square miles, of which 4.13 square miles  is land and 0.24 square mile  (5.49%) is water.

Climate

Demographics

At the 2010 census, there were 1,270 people, 550 households, and 393 families in the CDP. The population density was 317.5 people per square mile. There were 1,211 housing units at an average density of 293.2/sq mi. The racial makeup of the CDP was 94.6% White, 2.3% African American, 0.9% Asian, 1.1% from other races, and 1.1% from two or more races. Hispanic or Latino of any race were 5% of the population.

There were 550 households, 14.4% had children under the age of 18 living with them, 59.8% were married couples living together, 7.3% had a female householder with no husband present, and 28.5% were non-families. 22.7% of households were made up of individuals, and 9.5% were one person aged 65 or older. The average household size was 2.31 and the average family size was 2.68.

The age distribution was 16.5% under the age of 18, 58.9% from 18 to 64, and 24.6% 65 or older. The median age was 51.7 years.

References

External links
Big Bass Lake Information Page

Census-designated places in Wayne County, Pennsylvania
Census-designated places in Lackawanna County, Pennsylvania
Census-designated places in Pennsylvania